Stageco is an international staging, event and structures engineering company.

They design and custom build concert stages, corporate and sporting structures and temporary buildings for every kind of event.  They have built stages for some of the top-grossing tours.

With headquarters in Belgium, Stageco also has offices in France, the Netherlands, Germany, Austria, the United Kingdom and the United States. The Stageco Group employ around 170 staff including in-house designers, engineers, project managers and onsite crew.

Company Profile
Stageco designs and builds custom-made as well as standardised concert stages, temporary structures for all kind of events as well as supplying PA structures, sport and delay towers, event scaffolding, roof structures, hydraulic lifts and platforms and grandstand structures.
Examples of their work include touring stages for Coldplay, Muse and the U2 360 Tour. In 2010 Stageco created the double configuration stage at Download for AC/DC and bespoke temporary event structure The Drum for the Middle East Gas celebrations organised by WRG for the 77 Mta Task Force. The company also provide stages for a variety of festivals including 11 stages for Lowlands Festival and a wide variety of high end fashion shows, including for French designer Sonia Rykiel.

Company history
Stageco was founded by Hedwig De Meyer in Belgium in 1985, who built stages for the Rock Werchter Festival since 1977. By the mid eighties Stageco provided equipment for Genesis and Pink Floyd, whilst refining the tower systems and roofs. In 1992 the staging company worked directly with an architect to create a custom built stage for Genesis’ We Can't Dance tour. That same year Stageco US was incorporated, touring in the U.S. with Guns N' Roses and Metallica. Over the following years, new offices were opened in the Netherlands, Germany and France.

Awards 
Stageco was among seven winners in the Plasa innovation award for the companies new The Arena Lift
Stageco won Favourite Staging Company in the 2012 TPi Awards.

References

Event management companies of Belgium